Birla Institute of Technology & Science, Pilani - Dubai (BITS Pilani, Dubai Campus or BPDC) is a private technical research university and a constituent college of Dubai International Academic City. It became the international campus of BITS Pilani in 2000, making it the second campus established (other campuses: Pilani, Goa, Hyderabad). It is the first Indian university to have an overseas campus. The institute is backed by the Aditya Birla Group and is one of the first six institutes to be awarded the Institute of Eminence status in 2018.

BITS Pilani, Dubai offers undergraduate, graduate and doctoral programs in engineering and business management domains under 10 academic departments. It enrolls about 1,400 students every year, mostly from India, UAE, Oman, Qatar, Saudi Arabia and other GCC countries.

History

Inception 
The Birla Education Trust was founded in 1929; the intermediate college became a degree college and later offered postgraduate courses. The masters programme in electronics began in 1955.

Reacting to early criticism about the project, contemporary advisor Thomas Drew said:In my judgment to attempt to develop an American institution in India would be like trying to graft apples on a pine tree. We have not been asked to make such an attempt. We were asked to help devise in India an Indian technological school to produce graduates with the know-how to produce knowledge pertinent for India.... In many respects they consider us immature, rude, hypocritical barbarians who in certain respects happened to hit it lucky. To be viable in India an institution must be framed with Indian values in mind.BITS Pilani became a deemed university established under Section 3 of the UGC Act, 1956 by notification No. F.12-23/63.U-2 of 18 June 1964.

In 1964, the Birla Colleges of Humanities, Commerce, Engineering, Pharmacy and Science were merged to form the Birla Institute of Technology & Science. The board provided direction in developing a curriculum, selecting equipment, upgrading the library and recruiting (and training) an Indian faculty. To quicken the pace of reform he convinced C. R. Mitra to be the new director of the institute. Mitra advocated a "practice school" internship program as a requirement for faculty and students. The Practice School Program is still a requirement for students in BITS.

According to Robert Kargon and Stuart Leslie:BITS offered an opportunity to build a leading technological university in India responsive to India's goals, to produce practising engineers who will be in a position to graduate and to build industries in India, under Indian conditions. With its emphasis on the Practice School and ties to Indian industry, it helped educate Indian industrialists along with Indian engineers who would remain in India, in contrast to many other engineering colleges in India, most of whose graduates would leave the country after obtaining their basic engineering education. The Ford Foundation Evaluators...proudly noted that the Indian government, despite having given no direct financial support, was looking to BITS to provide a model for future development in education in engineering and science in India.

Multi-campus expansion 
Ghanshyam Das Birla, was born on 10 April 1894 at Pilani village, in the Indian state then known as Rajputana, as a member of the Maheshwari Marwari community. Later, Birla inherited the family business and moved to further diversify them into other areas. He became the founding president of Harijan Sevak Sangh founded by Mahatma Gandhi in Delhi in 1932 . Birla was a close associate and a steady supporter of Mahatma Gandhi, whom he met for the first time in 1916. Gandhi stayed at Birla's home in New Delhi during the last four months of his life.

Envisioning infrastructural development in his hometown, Birla founded the Birla Engineering College (rechristened as Birla Institute of Technology and Science in 1964) in Pilani and the Technological Institute of Textile & Sciences in Bhiwani among other educational institutions in 1943. Both colleges have evolved over the years to develop into one of India's best engineering schools. Dr. K.K. Birla, who took over as the Chairman in 1983, realized the need for providing top class higher education facility to greater number of promising students in science and technology.

In 1999, enrollment expanded from 2,500 to 4,000 and campuses were founded in Dubai (2000) and Goa (2004). In 2006, BITS Pilani acquired  of land from the Andhra Pradesh government through the Hyderabad Urban Development Authority for a new campus. The land is located in Jawaharnagar, Shameerpet Mandal in the Rangareddy district. The BITS Pilani Hyderabad campus opened in 2008; the school also has a virtual university and an extension center in Bangalore.

Consequent upon the sad demise of Dr. K.K. Birla in 2008, Dr. Kumar Mangalam Birla was elected as the Chancellor and Smt. Shobhana Bhartia was appointed as the Pro-Chancellor.

Dubai Campus 
BITS Dubai was the second campus of the university, set up in 2000 in Al Ghurair University Campus. Prof. M. Ramachandran was its founding director. It was then relocated to Dubai Knowledge Village, and again, to its permanent campus with student housing at Dubai International Academic City (a university town in Dubai) in September 2007.

BITS Pilani Dubai is approved by the Ministry of Human Resource Development, Government of India and University Grants Commission (UGC), India and is permitted by Knowledge & the Human Development Authority (KHDA), Government of Dubai.

Campus

Academic City 
The campus is situated in Dubai International Academic City (DIAC) and is a twenty-minute car ride away from the heart of Dubai and takes an hour or two via public transportation- RTA Dubai Metro and Bus. 

Students from the constituent colleges have access to its amenities like food court, residential halls, markets and restaurants.

BITS Pilani, Dubai has nine buildings comprising hostels, the main building and academic departments spanning over :

 The academic block has lecture halls, academic & administrative departments, conference halls, student & faculty lounges, a mini-mart, a sports complex, an auditorium and technical laboratories.
 Mechanical block consists of a workshop area on the ground floor and mechanical, civil, robotics and other interdepartmental labs on other floors.
 The library block consists of a library, discussion rooms, an OPAC & internet browsing centre, an activity room and a cafeteria.
 The institute has 6 hostels in total. The boys' hostel consists of four buildings (A, B, C, D) that share common facilities whereas the girls' hostel consists of two buildings (G, H) that share common facilities.
 Hostels are provided with facilities like mess halls, prayer hall, common room, recreation room, laundromat and gym.

The campus also consists of a full-length football field, indoor badminton court, race track, lawn tennis court, cricket nets, basketball court, volleyball court, indoor games and student activities section.

Labs
Labs at campus include - Advanced Molecular Biology Lab, Analog Electronics Lab, Biology Lab, Chemical Engineering Lab I & II, Chemistry Lab Communication Lab, Computer Aided Design Lab, Computer Programming Lab, Concrete Lab, Creative Lab, Digital Design Lab, Electrical Machines Lab, Engineering Graphics Lab, Environmental Lab, Fluid Machinery lab, Genetic Engineering Lab, Heat Transfer Lab, Industrial Microbiology & Bioprocess Engineering Lab, Intelligent Computing Facility, Instrumental Methods of Analysis Lab, Instrumentation Lab, Mechatronics & Robotics Lab, MEMS Lab, Materials Testing Lab, Microbiology Lab, Microprocessor Programming & Interfacing Lab, Petroleum Lab, Physics Lab, Power Electronics Lab, Prime Movers and Fluid Machinery Lab, Process Control Lab, Production Techniques I & II Labs, Signal and Simulation Lab, Software Systems Lab, Soil Mechanics and Foundation Engineering Lab, Survey Lab, Transport Phenomena Lab, Transportation Engineering Lab, Workshop Prime Movers & Fluid Mechanics Lab.

Administration

Administration
The college administration is divided into eight divisions:
 Faculty Affairs
 Sponsored Research and Consultancy
 International Programmes and Collaboration
 Practice School
 Student Welfare Division (SWD)
 Academic - Undergraduate Studies
 Academic - Graduate Studies and Research
 Alumni Relations

Academics

Departments
BITS Pilani has 10 academic departments:

 Biotechnology
 Chemical Engineering
 Civil Engineering
 Computer Science
 Electrical and Electronics Engineering
 General Sciences
 Humanities and Social Sciences
 Mechanical Engineering
 Mathematics
 Finance

All major and minor courses for undergraduate and postgraduate studies fall under these departments. Experiment and research labs along with other facilities set up in departmental buildings or floors are also governed by their respective departments.

Undergraduate programs 
BITS Pilani, Dubai Campus offers 4-year Integrated bachelor of engineering (B.E.) programs at the undergraduate level. The university also offers 5-year dual bachelor's degrees in two major fields. These programs are offered directly under the 9 academic departments. Course structure is flexible and curriculum allows students to enroll in general science, engineering, mathematics, management, humanities and other inter-disciplinary courses. Minor degrees in Aeronautics, Data Science, Finance, Material Science, Robotics, Philosophy, Economics and Politics are also awarded along with the undergraduate degree after completion of additional courses.

Graduate and research programs 
The Master of Engineering (M.E.) in Design engineering, Microelectronics, Software Systems, Electrical (with specialization in Power Electronics and Drives) and Master of Business Administration (M.B.A.) in Engineering and Technology Management and IT Enabled Services Management.

Doctoral programs
PhD and research programmes are offered:
 Full-Time
 Part-Time

BITS Pilani, Dubai Campus has also entered into a research collaboration with the International Center for Biosaline Agriculture (ICBA), Dubai, UAE.

Practice School
Practice School (PS) is a programme unique to BITS Pilani university, through which students are placed in the industry for a hands-on learning experience. PS-1, a two-month internship programme for the summer after the second year, is compulsory for all students. PS-2 is an extended internship programme, usually of five and a half months duration that students may go for in their final year. The students are graded by the off-campus BITS faculty and the PS mentor. The allocation is based on the academic record of the student and is managed centrally. Every PS station roughly accommodates 6-7 students.

Practice School is aimed at familiarizing students with the work environment and technical standards in the industry. Students can also opt for a thesis instead of Practice School II where they will have to work under a professor either on campus or off campus on some research area related to their discipline. In case of an off-campus thesis, an on-campus guide will coordinate with the off-campus guide for a smooth process.

Admissions
BITS Pilani is offered to students based on their performance in the All-India Entrance Examination, called BITS Admission Test (BITSAT). BITS Pilani also has the policy of accepting State and National Board toppers. There is no reservation of seats on the basis of caste or category. BITSAT. is a computer based test and is held at BITS authorised test centres. The examination chiefly covers topics, based on the NCERT higher secondary curriculum, in Physics, Chemistry and Mathematics, and reasoning and analytical skills in Logic and English. Any student having a minimum aggregate of 75% in Physics, Maths and Chemistry, and a minimum of 60% marks in each of the BITSAT subjects individually is eligible to apply to the campus.

For international students, Dubai Campus also accepts SAT Subject Tests. Since the mode of instruction is English, students who have passed the qualifying examination in a non-English medium must satisfy the minimum requirement of TOEFL or IELTS.

Student life & culture
Students at BPDC are mostly of Indian nationality and comprise day scholars and hostellers. Day scholars are residents of Dubai, Sharjah and Abu Dhabi.

DIAC Residential Halls 
DIAC has two residential halls: Myriad and KSK Homes, shared by students of different universities. They are equipped with retail shops, leisure facilities, library and shopping centres.
 Myriad: A student accommodation located in front of the BITS campus. It consists of twin rooms, single rooms or studio rooms. The rooms have an adjoining shower room, with shared kitchen lounges across the building. The halls have other facilities like a gym, a laundromat, dedicated blocks for male and female residents, sports facilities such as a swimming pool and basketball court, and entertainment facilities such as the outdoor amphitheatre and Myriacade (gaming and recreation room).
 KSK Homes: These residences are located almost 1 km from the BITS campus. They consist of single, double and twin rooms and have a variety of social spaces, floor lounges, a communal kitchen, a dining hall, gaming areas, courtyards, gym and study centres.

Clubs and associations
BPDC has various technical and non-technical clubs, associations and societies. Technical clubs include student chapters of international associations like Association for Computing Machinery, Institute of Electrical and Electronics Engineers, American Society of Mechanical Engineers, American Institute of Chemical Engineers, SAE International and American Society of Heating, Refrigerating and Air-Conditioning Engineers. Other clubs like Microsoft Tech Club, Association for Electronic Engineers (AOEE), Intelligent Flying Object for Reconnaissance (IORTA) and Linux User Group fall under the college's respective academic departments.

The university also has 15 student-run cultural clubs and societies, including Groove (Dance Club), Trebel (Music Club), Shades (Art and Craft Club), Reflexions (Photography Club), Paribhasha (Drama Club), Oh Crop! (Design Club), Debating Society, The Wall Street Club (Finance, Economics and Management Club), Flummoxed (Quiz Club), BITS Motorsports, Allure (Fashion Club), Guild (Gaming Club), a Social Activities Club, a Literary Club, and an Environment Club. The goal of such clubs is to enrich the Institute's social and cultural life. Apart from these, it also has student chapters of international organizations like Make a Difference, Toastmasters International, Model United Nations.

Events
 BITS Sports Festival (BSF):  BSF is UAE's largest inter-university sports event, over the last 16 years. Around 45 universities from all over UAE compete against each other in more than 10 sporting events for Men and Women. These events are sponsored by big brands like Coca Cola, Nikon, KFC, Radio Mirchi
 Jashn:  It is one of UAE's largest inter-university cultural festivals. In 2019, it started with Zakir Khan taking the stage and ended with the celebration of the semester as Sunburn Festival transformed BPDC into UAE’s first-ever Sunburn Campus.
 Recharge:  Inter-hostel sports competition supported by various teams and fan clubs donning their own merchandise.
 Sparks: An Intra College Cultural Festival which is organised by the Event Management Committee (EMC) every year in the month of October. In this event, different student clubs and bodies collectively conduct several events.
 ENGINuity:  An annual inter-university techno-managerial and innovation festival that serves as a platform for students to show their technical affinity. It aims at forming a conglomerate of students with a mutual interest in science, technology and management. 

Apart from these festivals, academic departments and student clubs organize various technical, non-technical and cultural events and competitions like Technofest, Ethnic day, Spectrum, and ARTEX (Art Exhibition) throughout the semester. Each academic year at BPDC begins with a cultural event for freshmen known as 'icebreakers', which is held after the orientation.

BPDC Unplugged - Radio Station
BPDC unplugged is campus radio station (CRS) of BITS Pilani, Dubai. It is an in-house radio that generally broadcasts various events around the campus and conducts podcasts on regular basis.

Notable alumni
 Gaurav Chaudhary (Technical Guruji)- YouTube personality, tech vlogger, nano-science researcher.
 Ram Arun Castro - Indian film actor.
 Adil Ibrahim - Indian radio jockey, television host and actor.

Other campuses

 Pilani Campus
 Goa Campus
 Hyderabad Campus
 Mumbai Campus

See also
 Institutes of Eminence
 Dubai International Academic City

References

External links

 

Dubai
Dubai International Academic City
Universities and colleges in Dubai
Educational institutions established in 2000
2000 establishments in the United Arab Emirates

hi:बिरला प्रौद्योगिकी एवं विज्ञान संस्थान पिलानी